Château de Fonbel is a Bordeaux wine from Saint-Émilion appellation. It is produced by Alain Vautier from nearby and highly ranked Chateau Ausone with a blend that is primarily Merlot. Cabernet Sauvignon, Petit Verdot and a small amount of Carmenere are also used.

References

External links
Château de Fonbel official site

Bordeaux wine producers